The Penn-York Valley (referred to locally as The Valley) is a group of communities that straddles the New York and Pennsylvania border.  It includes the villages and boroughs of:
 Waverly, New York
 Sayre, Pennsylvania
 Athens, Pennsylvania
 South Waverly, Pennsylvania
These four central communities have a population of 14,822 as of the 2000 Census, and a population of 14,425 as of the 2010 Census.  The entire Greater Valley has a population near 35,000.

Due to geographic boundaries, the Penn-York Valley is broken up into two Census regions: the Binghamton metropolitan area and the Sayre micropolitan area.  The Valley is part of the Twin Tiers.

The community saw historic flooding due to rain from Tropical Storm Lee, exceeding levels of the Mid-Atlantic United States flood of 2006. Damages in Tioga County alone were estimated at around $100 million.

Education
The Penn-York Valley's education system is set by three different and separate school districts.
Waverly Central School District - Serving Waverly, Chemung, Lockwood, and sections of Lowman, Barton, and Wellsburg.
Sayre Area School District - Serving Sayre, South Waverly, and Litchfield.
Athens Area School District - Serving Athens, Athens Township, Ridgebury, Smithfield, Ulster and Sheshequin.

Private Education
Epiphany School - catholic Elementary and Middle school in Sayre.
Zion Ministerial Institute - private religious school in Waverly, of the religious organization Zion Fellowship International. The organization's world headquarters in Waverly.

Transportation
The valley has three local bus services, the first is Ride Tioga. Ride Tioga stops throughout Waverly, Sayre, and Barton. The second is BeST Transit. BeST Transit makes numerous stops in Waverly, Sayre, and Athens and provides service to Towanda, Wysox, Troy, Canton, and the Lycoming Mall. The third is C-TRAN operating out of Elmira and making daily stops in Waverly,  Wilawana, Chemung and points west.  Shortline Coach USA and Greyhound regional bus services stop in Waverly, as well. The village also has taxi service available through Valley Taxi which travels throughout the vicinities of Waverly, Sayre, Athens, and Binghamton. The valley is also conveniently located between the Elmira-Corning Regional Airport in the Town of Big Flats and the Greater Binghamton Airport located in Maine, New York, both of which are medium-sized regional airports serving the Southern Tier of New York.

Media
Newspaper
 Press & Sun Bulletin (based in Binghamton, serves the area)
 Morning Times (based in Sayre; serves Waverly, Sayre, Athens and surrounding communities)
 The Daily Review (based in Towanda; serves the Penn-York Valley and Bradford County)
 Star Gazette (based in Elmira; serves Tioga, Chemung and Steuben Counties in NY and Bradford County in PA)

Radio
 WAVR - 102.1 FM (based in Sayre; licensed in Waverly for FM broadcasting)
 WATS - 960 AM (based in Sayre; licensed in Sayre for AM broadcasting)
 WCIH - 94.3 FM (based in Elmira; licensed in Elmira for FM broadcasting)
 WEBO - 1330 AM (based in Owego; branded to Waverly for AM broadcasting)
 WENI-FM - 92.7 FM (based in Elmira; licensed in S. Waverly for FM broadcasting)
 WGMF-FM - 103.9 FM (licensed in Dushore, Pennsylvania)

Television
 WBNG-TV Binghamton NY - CBS Affiliate
 WIVT-TV Binghamton NY - ABC Affiliate
 WBGH-CA Binghamton NY - NBC Affiliate
 WICZ-TV Binghamton NY - Fox Affiliate
 WETM-TV Elmira NY - NBC Affiliate
 WENY-TV Elmira NY - ABC Affiliate
 WENY-DT2 Elmira NY - CBS Affiliate
 W52CE-TV Sayre PA - Fox Affiliate, (a Class A broadcast relay station for WOLF-TV Hazleton PA - UHF)
 WNEP-TV Scranton PA - ABC Affiliate
 WYOU-TV Scranton PA - CBS Affiliate
 YNN Syracuse NY - Time Warner Cable Regional

References 

Regions of New York (state)
Regions of Pennsylvania
Geography of Bradford County, Pennsylvania
Geography of Tioga County, New York
Valleys of New York (state)
Valleys of Pennsylvania